Naufahu Whyte (born 4 April 2002) is a professional rugby league footballer who plays as a  or  for the Sydney Roosters in the NRL.

Playing career
In round 22 2021, Whyte made his NRL debut for the Sydney Roosters against the Brisbane Broncos at Suncorp Stadium in a 21-20 win. Whyte re-signed with the Roosters club until the end of 2024.

References

External links
Sydney Roosters profile

2002 births
Living people
New Zealand rugby league players
North Sydney Bears NSW Cup players
Rugby league players from Auckland
Rugby league props
Sydney Roosters players